Shantabaa Medical College and General Hospital, Amreli is a Medical College located in Amreli, Gujarat, India. The hospital is named after Shantabaa Haribhai Gajera, mother of industrialist Vasant Gajera, who is the founder of Laxmi Diamond Pvt Ltd and Gajera Trust.

SMCGH is established under Gajera Trust in the year 2017. It is under the Public-Private Partnership with the Government of Gujarat since June 2018. The college imparts the degree Bachelor of Medicine and Surgery (MBBS). Nursing and para-medical courses are also offered. The college is affiliated to Saurashtra University and is recognised by Medical Council of India. The hospital associated with the college is in Amreli. The selection to the college is done on the basis of merit through National Eligibility and Entrance Test. Yearly undergraduate student intake is 150.

Courses
Shantabaa Medical College, Amreli undertakes education and training of students MBBS courses. This college is offering 150 MBBS seats from 2019 of which 85% Seats are of state quota and 15% is for Nation Counselling.

References

2017 establishments in Gujarat
Educational institutions established in 2017
Medical colleges in Gujarat